is a Japanese band from Sakado, Saitama, originally formed by brothers Takaki and Yasuyuki Horigome in October 1996. The two are also pursuing their own solo efforts.

In April 2013, Yasuyuki left the band to focus on his solo career. In the summer of that year, Takaki took over and continued the band with the addition of five new members under the name "KIRINJI".

On January 31, 2020, Kirinji announced the end of its current band activities. The last live "KIRINJI LIVE 2020" of the four-piece band was held on December 9th and 10th, 2020, ending its eight year activity. Kirinji announced its new format will be applied after they finished the tours promoting Cherish. In the new format, the band will be active as a variable music group (solo project), including the past band members centering on Takaki Horigome.

Members
 —  Vocals, chorus, and guitar (1996–present)

Former members
 — Lead vocals, chorus, and guitar (1996–2013)
 — Vocals, chorus, piano, and keyboards (2013–2017)
 — Pedal steel guitar, steelpans, guitar, vocals, chorus, and banjo (2013–2020)
 — Drums, percussion, vocals, and chorus (2013–2020)
 — Bass guitar, bass synthesizer, vocals, chorus, and trombone (2013–2020)
 — Guitar, vocals, chorus, and violin (2013–2020)

Discography

Original albums

"3" (November 8, 2000)
"Fine" (November 21, 2001)
"For Beautiful Human Life" (September 26, 2003)
"Dodecagon" (October 25, 2006)
"7 -Seven-" (March 19, 2008)
"Buoyancy" (September 1, 2010)
"Super View" (November 7, 2012)
"Ten" (March 27, 2013)
"11" (August 7, 2014)

"Cherish" (November 20, 2019)
"crepuscular" (December 3, 2021 (streaming), December 8, 2021 (CD))

Other albums
"2 in 1" (March 24, 1999; Independent label)
"Kirinji RMX" (April 25, 2001)
"Kirinji RMX II" (April 24, 2002)
"Omnibus" (November 20, 2002)
"Kirinji Tour 2003/Live at Budokan" (February 25, 2004)
"Kirinji Archives Singles Best" (June 23, 2004)
"2 in 1 ~10th Anniversary Edition~" (March 19, 2008)
"Kirinji 1998-2008 10th Anniversary Celebration" (December 10, 2008)
"Songbook ~Connoisseur Series~" (October 19, 2011)
"Extra-11" (November 11, 2015)
"KIRINJI 20132020" (November 18, 2020)

Singles

"Drifter"/ (July 25, 2001)

"You And Me" (May 12, 2004)

/ (June 21, 2006)

"Killer tune kills me feat. YonYon" (June 5, 2019)

"Rainy Runaway" (June 22, 2022) m.s

Digital release singles

"Golden harvest"/"Lullaby" (September 27, 2006)

"Ladybird" (July 25, 2007)

"Trekking Song" (October 10, 2012)

Other works
A remixed version of their song "Good Day Good Bye" is in Fantastic Plastic Machine's Sound Concierge Annex Contemporary Love Songs.
Track 10 of We Love Katamari, Houston, was re-arranged by Kirinji. Additionally, the song "Bluff Spirit" in We Love Katamari was sung and composed by them.
Takaki Horigome had worked for Namco for a while during his early days in the band. He composed music for various games. The most notable one is Pac-Attack where he is listed as "Polygome" for the SNES and Sega Genesis Versions and as his regular name in the Namco Anthology 2 updated version for the PlayStation.

References

External links
Official website 
Official website at Natural Foundation 
Kirinji at Myspace
Kirinji at Discogs
Kirinji at Nippon Columbia 
Kirinji at Universal Music Japan 

Japanese pop music groups
Nippon Columbia artists
Universal Music Japan artists
Musical groups from Saitama Prefecture